TriStar Television, Inc. (first spelled Tri-Star, and abbreviated as TT) is an American television production studio that is a division of Sony Entertainment's Sony Pictures Television. TriStar Television was launched in 
March 1986 by TriStar Pictures, and remained a joint-venture between Columbia Pictures, CBS, and HBO until it was acquired by Sony Pictures Entertainment, the parent of both Columbia and TriStar. After a purchase by Sony Pictures Entertainment, both companies Columbia Pictures Television and TriStar Television merged and formed Columbia TriStar Television on February 21, 1994. The television studio was relaunched twice and is currently a specialty label for Sony Pictures Television. The entity was originally a sister company of Columbia Pictures Television which was shut down in 2001.

History

It was formed when Tri-Star Pictures joined forces with Stephen J. Cannell Productions and Witt/Thomas Productions and created a television distribution company called TeleVentures. Scott Siegler was immediately hired as president of the studio. As the Tri-Star Television studio rolled around, the company inked overall deals with various personnel, like Ron Samuels, Richard Leder, Michael Jacobs, Larry Tucker, Donald P. Bellisario, Jim Green and Larry Epstein to help develop projects for the studio and decided that they would be involved in various television movies.

By December 1987, Coca-Cola owned 80% Columbia Pictures Entertainment until January 1988, when it was reduced down to 49% and Tri-Star Television was then merged with Columbia/Embassy Television into the reorganized Columbia Pictures Television (CPT) in January 1988, although TeleVentures was retained to handle sales of the existing Tri-Star programs that were inherited under contract to CPT, which would continue as a separate sales and distribution company from the CPT unit. Scott remained president of the studio until he left in 1993. Columbia Pictures Entertainment was sold in November 1989 to Sony of Japan.

In the late of 1988, Witt/Thomas Productions withdrew from the TeleVentures venture, ceding it to Walt Disney Television, and sold its shares to Cannell. On July 11, 1990, both Tri-Star and Cannell dissolved the TeleVentures joint venture and Tri-Star sold its shares to Stephen J. Cannell Productions and TeleVentures became Cannell Distribution Co. Most of the series and the Tri-Star film packages that were distributed by TeleVentures were taken over by Columbia Pictures Television Distribution.

Revival and merger with Columbia Pictures Television

CPT would continue on under Sony Pictures Entertainment (SPE), but TriStar Television was reestablished in October 1991 after CPT acquired some of the library of New World Television. Jon Feltheimer, who was president of New World Television became the new president of TriStar Television. On March 15, 1993, star Larry Hagman had signed a deal with the studio to develop projects for the 1993-94 TV season. On February 21, 1994, TriStar Television merged with Columbia Pictures Television and formed Columbia TriStar Television (CTT). In 1997, most new shows, and some existing TriStar shows like Early Edition, dropped the separate CPT and TriStar logos and begin placing it under the CTT logo, and also in January 1997, changed monikers from Sony Television Entertainment to Columbia TriStar Television Group.

When TriStar Television's productions were folded into Columbia TriStar Television in 1999, Early Edition (a joint production with CBS) retained the TriStar copyright until 2000. The final season of Malcolm & Eddie was later produced by CTT and TriStar Television operated in-name-only. On October 25, 2001, Columbia TriStar Television and Columbia TriStar Television Distribution merged to become Columbia TriStar Domestic Television. On September 16, 2002, SPE retired the Columbia and TriStar names from television, renaming CTDT as Sony Pictures Television.

Second revival

On May 28, 2015, TriStar Television was re-launched as a boutique production label for Sony Pictures Television. Until her death in March 2018, the revived studio was run by Suzanne Patmore-Gibbs after being in-name-only for 15 years. The first new series was Good Girls Revolt and was piloted for Amazon Prime Video on November 5, 2015.

List of shows by TriStar Television

References

Sony Pictures Television
Television production companies of the United States
Entertainment companies based in California
Sony Pictures Entertainment
Predecessors of Sony Pictures Television
Companies based in Culver City, California

Re-established companies
American companies established in 1991
American companies established in 2015
1986 establishments in California
1988 disestablishments in California
1991 establishments in California
1999 disestablishments in California
2015 establishments in California